Camisiidae is a family of oribatids in the order Oribatida. There are at least 3 genera and 70 described species in Camisiidae.

Genera
 Austronothrus Hammer, 1966
 Camisia Heyden, 1826
 Heminothrus Berlese, 1913

References

Further reading

 
 
 
 

Acariformes
Acari families